Frankie Laine's Greatest Hits is a compilation album by Frankie Laine released in 1958 on Columbia Records.

In 1962, this monaural album was re-released in an "electronically rechanneled for stereo" version.

Track listing

References 

1958 compilation albums
Frankie Laine albums
Columbia Records compilation albums